Hygromia limbata is a species of small air-breathing land snail, a terrestrial pulmonate gastropod mollusk in the family Hygromiidae. 

Subspecies
 Hygromia limbata limbata (Draparnaud, 1805)
 Hygromia limbata sublimbata (Bourguignat, 1882)

Distribution
This species is known to occur in:
 Great Britain
 France

References

 Kerney, M.P., Cameron, R.A.D. & Jungbluth, J-H. (1983). Die Landschnecken Nord- und Mitteleuropas. Ein Bestimmungsbuch für Biologen und Naturfreunde, 384 pp., 24 plates
 Draparnaud, J.-P.-R. (1805). Histoire naturelle des mollusques terrestres et fluviatiles de la France. 2 pp. (Avertissement a sa Majesté l'Impératrice), 2 pp. Rapport, i-viii (Préface), 1–164, pl. 1-13, 1 p. Errata.

External links
  Draparnaud, J.-P.-R. (1805). Histoire naturelle des mollusques terrestres et fluviatiles de la France. 2 pp. (Avertissement a sa Majesté l'Impératrice), 2 pp. Rapport, i-viii (Préface), 1-164, pl. 1-13, 1 p. Errata.
 AnimalBase info at: 

Hygromia
Gastropods described in 1805